Faculty of Arts, Banaras Hindu University is a faculty in the Banaras Hindu University, Varanasi, India which offers courses in Humanities along with various professional and vocational courses except social sciences. It was founded in 1898 and is the oldest and largest faculty in the University. Faculty of Arts was formerly known as the Central Hindu College (1898–1916). In 1916, the Banaras Hindu University grew around the nucleus of the Faculty of Arts.

History
Formally known as Central Hindu College, the Faculty of Arts is the oldest and largest faculty in the Banaras Hindu University. It was founded in 1898 by Annie Besant and became the main centre and the core of the Banaras Hindu University in 1916 founded by Mahamana Pandit Madan Mohan Malviya. The Faculty of Arts is often called the mother faculty of the University, many other faculties and departments of the university grew around it.

Organization
Faculty of Arts' administrative head is a dean. The dean is responsible for all aspects of the faculty's operations, including budgets, administration, planning, support services, faculty appointments, curricula and student affairs. The dean is appointed by and reports to the Vice-Chancellor of the university.

There are 23 different departments in the Faculty of Arts that offer Certificate courses, Special courses, Undergraduate diploma, undergraduate degree (UG), advanced postgraduate diploma, postgraduate degree (PG) and Doctorate in following three categoriesHistory, Culture and Philosophy; Language and Literature; and Professional and Vocational courses.

Departments
The faculty houses departments of various languages such as those of English, Bengali, French, Hindi, Sanskrit, Telugu, German, Marathi, Arabic, Urdu, Persian other foreign languages, other Indian languages; it also houses departments of linguistics, archaeology, Pali & Buddhism, philosophy and religion, physical education, journalism, history of art, and library science. The faculty has niche departments such as Bhojpuri Adhyayan Kendra, Bharat Adhyayan Kendra, and Malaviya Moolya Anusheelan Kendra.

Notable alumni

Notable alumni of the faculty of arts include:

See also 
List of educational institutions in Varanasi

References

External links
 

Educational institutions established in 1898
1898 establishments in India
Departments of the Banaras Hindu University